Ranjit Singh Dhillon is an Indian politician from the state of Punjab and was member of the Punjab Legislative Assembly from 2012 to 2017.

Politics 
Dhillon was elected as a MLA from Ludhiana East in 2012 and remained in office till 2017. In 2017 Elections he lost to Indian National Congress Candidate Sanjeev Talwar and currently he is serving as Shiromani Akali Dal candidate for 2022 Punjab Legislative Assembly election from Ludhiana East Constituency .

Political party 
Dhillon is a member of Shiromani Akali Dal.

External links 
 Member of Legislative Assembly
 Leader Bio – Ranjit Singh Dhillon

People from Punjab, India
Shiromani Akali Dal politicians
Living people
1965 births